Khaneh Ket (also Romanized as Khāneh Ket and Khaneh-i-Kat; also known as Khāneh Ket Baker, Khāneh Qasţ, and Khani Kat) is a village in Khir Rural District, Runiz District, Estahban County, Fars Province, Iran. At the 2006 census, its population was 1,108, in 238 families.

References 

Populated places in Estahban County